Camberwell is a district of London, England.

Camberwell may also refer to:
Camberwell, New South Wales, Australia
Camberwell, Victoria, Australia
City of Camberwell, a former local government area that existed before the state's 1994 amalgamations.
Metropolitan Borough of Camberwell, London, England
Camberwell (EP), by Basement Jaxx
Camberwell beauty (Nymphalis antiopa), a butterfly from the family Nymphalidae